Macclesfield railway station is a main line station serving the Cheshire town of Macclesfield. It lies on the Stafford to Manchester branch of the West Coast Main Line in the United Kingdom.

Facilities at the station include ticket sales, a kiosk, a waiting room and public toilets. Before the bus station was relocated and rebuilt in 2004, the railway and bus stations were sited very close to each other.

It is one of the three stations that provide access to the Middlewood Way, which follows the route of the former Macclesfield, Bollington and Marple Railway.

History 
The London and North Western Railway (LNWR) opened the line between Manchester and Macclesfield on 19 June 1849. On this date the North Staffordshire Railway (NSR) completed the Congleton to Macclesfield section of its main Macclesfield - Stoke - Norton Bridge line. A new joint station, managed by a committee of both companies, was opened at Hibel Road a month later, replacing the temporary LNWR station at Beech Bridge.

During the 1860s, the North Staffordshire Railway collaborated with the Manchester, Sheffield and Lincolnshire railway (MS&LR) to construct a joint railway between Macclesfield and Marple near Manchester. For the North Stafford this would provide a route to Manchester independently of the LNWR. For the MS&LR it would provide a link to Stoke-on-Trent and the south. The joint railway was constituted as the Macclesfield, Bollington and Marple Railway (MB&M). It was opened throughout to a second, temporary Macclesfield station for passengers on 2 August 1869 and to goods on 1 March 1870. The MB&M then constructed its own permanent Macclesfield station called Macclesfield Central. It was just south of the LNWR station, which was renamed Macclesfield Hibel Road for clarity. The new MB&M station was connected to the rest of the joint line for goods on 3 April 1871 and opened for passengers on 1 July 1873.  It closed to all traffic south of Rose Hill in January 1970.

Some North Staffordshire Railway through trains from Macclesfield railway station used the Potteries Loop Line.

By the late 1920s there was one freight train a day from Macclesfield central to Normacot railway station, this train used the Potteries Loop line.

On 7 November 1960, British Railways closed Macclesfield Hibel Road. Macclesfield Central was vastly remodelled and is now called simply Macclesfield station. As with other stations on the West Coast Main Line, Macclesfield station was rebuilt in the Brutalist style of architecture - the beauty of the building was perceived to be its very functionality, and its design follows the Modernist approach.

The station won the "Best Kept Station in Cheshire Award" for 2007, but was reported in summer 2011 to be "distinctly shabby", with peeling paintwork.

There are three platforms but only two are in regular use, the up platform for services to Manchester and the down platform to Stoke-on-Trent and Birmingham. Platform 3 sees a small number of services. Evidence of a fourth platform can be seen, on which a Network Rail building now exists.

Accidents and incidents
On 26 July 1971, an electric multiple unit departed from the station against signals and was derailed by trap points.

Services 

Macclesfield is served by Avanti West Coast, CrossCountry and Northern Trains services.

Southbound, there are also four trains per hour.

It is planned for Macclesfield to get one High Speed 2 service from London per hour once High Speed 2 becomes operational.

Notes

Citations

References

External links 

Macclesfield
Railway stations in Cheshire
Railway stations in Great Britain opened in 1873
Railway stations served by CrossCountry
Northern franchise railway stations
Railway stations served by Avanti West Coast
Articles containing video clips
Former London and North Western Railway stations
Stations on the West Coast Main Line
DfT Category C1 stations